Hindki is a term originally used by Pashtuns to denote people or communities of Indian origin that they have been in contact with. More specifically this may include:
historical Indian communities in Afghanistan, which were formerly active in trade and finance;
people of Indian origin who have in recent historical times converted to Islam;
speakers of Hindko.

See also 
 Hindkowans

References 

Ethnonyms